Qipan railway station is a railway station of Jilin–Shulan Railway and Jiuzhan–Jiangmifeng Railway. The station located in the Longtan District of Jilin, Jilin province, China, 19 kilometers away from Jilin Station and 71 kilometers away from Huantouqinshulan Station.

It is under the jurisdiction of Jilin Train Department of China Railway Shenyang Bureau Group Co.Ltd. (formerly Shenyang Railway Bureau).

See also 
Jilin–Shulan Railway
Jiuzhan–Jiangmifeng Railway

References

Railway stations in Jilin